Helmut Lotti (born Helmut Barthold Johannes Alma Lotigiers; 22 October 1969), is a Belgian tenor and singer-songwriter. Lotti performs in several styles and languages. Once an Elvis impersonator, he has sung African and Latino and Jewish music hit records, and he crossed over into classical music in the 1990s.

Life and music
The son of Luc and Rita (née Lagrou), Helmut Barthold Johannes Alma Lotigiers was born in Ghent, Belgium, and began his singing career with a visual and singing style in an obvious imitation of Elvis Presley, and was described as "De Nieuwe Elvis" (in Dutch) or "The New Elvis". His first two albums were Vlaamse Nachten ("Flemish Nights", 1990) and Alles Wat Ik Voel ("All That I Feel", 1992). After a few more albums, he changed direction in 1995 with the first of what became a long series of "Helmut Lotti Goes Classic" albums, which proved to increase his popularity. Since 2000 he has also made successful recordings in traditional Latino, African and Russian-style music.

Lotti sings in his native language Dutch, as well as Afrikaans, English, French, German, Hebrew, Italian, Latin, Russian, Spanish, Ukrainian, Zulu, Xhosa, Ndebele and others. His albums has sold over 13 million worldwide.

Lotti does volunteer work as an ambassador for UNICEF. Lotti took part in the 0110 concerts against racism, organised by Tom Barman. 

He was married 3 times, divorced 3 times and has 1 daughter. Lotti was diagnosed with autism as an adult.

Discography

References

External links

 Helmut Lotti official site (English language) 

1969 births
Living people
Musicians from Ghent
20th-century Belgian male singers
20th-century Belgian singers
Belgian singer-songwriters
Male songwriters
Grand Officers of the Order of the Crown (Belgium)
English-language singers from Belgium
Dutch-language singers of Belgium
21st-century Belgian male singers
21st-century Belgian singers
People on the autism spectrum
Elvis impersonators